Viktor Krizhanivskyi (May 12, 1950 – July 22, 2016) was a Ukrainian painter and artist.

In 1982 Kryzhanivskyi graduated from Kiev State Institute of Arts. At the time of his death he was a lecturer of the Department of Drawing Art of National Academy of Arts and Architecture, a member of the National Art's Union, a Doctor of Philosophy in Fine Arts (Kingston University)  and a participant in municipal, state and international exhibitions. He organized twenty personal exhibitions for 30 years of his creative work.  His original works are exhibited in museums in Ukraine as well as in personal collections around the world.

External links
 New personal site of Viktor Kryzhanivskyi
 Old personal site of Viktor Kryzhanivskyi
 Kryzhanivskyi's paintings

1950 births
2016 deaths
20th-century Ukrainian painters
20th-century Ukrainian male artists
21st-century Ukrainian painters
21st-century Ukrainian male artists
Alumni of Kingston University
Ukrainian male painters